Asperula aristata is a deciduous species of perennial groundcover, and a flowering plant in the family Rubiaceae, known as woodruff. It is native to Morocco, Libya, Algeria, Tunisia, Azerbaijan, Georgia, Armenia, Greece, Bulgaria, Albania, Serbia, North Macedonia, Croatia, Italy, Austria, Switzerland, France, Spain, and Portugal.

Description 

Asperula aristata appears as a long green plant, with small (1in) pale purple flowers, on long, thin, green, stems. It has thin, green, grass-like leaves. It flowers around May–June.

Subspecies
, Plants of the World Online accepted the following subspecies:

Cultivation

Asperula aristata grows best in a rock garden, trough or crevice.

References 

aristata
Flora of the Mediterranean Basin
Flora of Europe
Flora of North Africa
Flora of the Caucasus